The following lists events that happened during 2022 in the Maldives.

Incumbents
President: Ibrahim Mohamed Solih
Vice President: Faisal Naseem

Events

Ongoing
 COVID-19 pandemic in the Maldives

February
 2 February - Madivaru Airport was opened.

March
2 March – Maldives voted on a United Nations resolution condemning Russia for its invasion of Ukraine.

Sport
Maldives at the 2022 Commonwealth Games

References

 
2020s in the Maldives
Years of the 21st century in the Maldives
Maldives
Maldives